The list of shipwrecks in June 1918 includes ships sunk, foundered, grounded, or otherwise lost during June 1918.

1 June

2 June

3 June

4 June

5 June

6 June

7 June

8 June

9 June

10 June

}}

11 June

12 June

13 June

14 June

15 June

16 June

17 June

 was scuttled at Novorossiysk.
}}

18 June

20 June

21 June

22 June

23 June

24 June

25 June

26 June

27 June

28 June

29 June

30 June

Unknown date

References

1918-06
 06